The 1973–74 season was Cardiff City F.C.'s 47th season in the Football League. They competed in the 22-team Division Two, then the second tier of English football, finishing seventeenth.

Manager Jimmy Scoular, who had been in charge of the club for more than 9 years, left the club in November to be replaced by Frank O'Farrell.

Players

  

Source.

League standings

Results by round

Fixtures and results

Second Division

Source

League Cup

FA Cup

European Cup Winners Cup

Welsh Cup

See also
Cardiff City F.C. seasons

References

Bibliography

Welsh Football Data Archive

Cardiff City F.C. seasons
Association football clubs 1973–74 season
Card